The Back Room is the debut studio album by British rock band Editors, released on 25 July 2005 through Kitchenware Records. They formed while attending university, and later migrated to Birmingham, where they would play club shows and make demos. After signing to Kitchenware in late 2004, the band recorded their debut album at three different studios in Lincolnshire, London and Wolverhampton. The majority of the album had been produced by Jim Abbiss, save for one track that was produced by Gavin Monaghan. The Back Room is a post-punk revival, gothic rock and indie pop album that has been compared to the various works of Echo & the Bunnymen, Elbow and Interpol.

"Bullets" was released as lead single from The Back Room in January 2005, which was followed by a tour of the UK. "Munich" and "Blood" were released as the album's second and third singles in April and June 2005, respectively. The album's release was promoted with a UK tour throughout July 2005; following their debut US show in September 2005, "Bullets" was re-released. Editors then supported Franz Ferdinand on their tour of the UK, leading to their own headlining tour at the end of 2005. In early 2006, "Munich" was re-released; they promoted it with tours in the US and the UK. "All Sparks" was released as the fourth single in March 2006, which was followed by a co-headlining US tour with Stellastarr. "Blood" was re-released in June 2006, after a short UK tour, and was promoted with another US tour.

The Back Room received generally positive reviews from music critics; opinions were split on the Editors' influences and the lyrics, but were receptive to frontman Tom Smith's vocals. The album reached number two in Scotland and the United Kingdom, in addition to charting in Ireland, the Netherlands and the United States. All of the album's singles performed well in the UK: "Bullets" peaked at number 27; "Munich" peaked at number 10; "Blood" peaked at number 18; and "All Sparks" peaked at number 21. The Back Room was nominated for the 2006 Mercury Prize, and was later certified platinum in the UK, and gold in Belgium, Ireland and the Netherlands. It appeared on several album of the year lists by the likes of Drowned in Sound, NME and PopMatters, among others, as well as appeared on best of the decade lists by laut.de and OOR.

Background and recording
Editors formed in 2003 during the emergence of the post-punk revival; they started under the name Snowfield, consisting of Tom Smith on vocals and guitar, Chris Urbanowicz on guitar, Russel Leetch on bass and Ed Lay on drummer. All of the members had met at Staffordshire University in 2000 and ended up living together. Urbanowicz said that he had grown tired of guitar-centric music following Britpop, though mentioned that the members had bonded over their adoration of Is This It (2001) by the Strokes and Asleep in the Back (2001) by Elbow. As every one of them could play instruments and shared similar music tastes, they decided to form a band. They were taking a music technology course together, which allowed them use of practice rooms and recording studios. After graduating, they moved to Birmingham, where they split time between the band and working jobs to afford rent. Following various club shows and demos, the band attracted British record labels.

Between late 2003 and mid-2004, the band played three-to-four showcases per week for interested labels. They eventually signed to Kitchenware Records in late 2004, which had recently been revived following a dormancy period. After this, the band changed their name to Editors, which Smith said was "no witty comment on any kind of journalism".  In early 2005, the band had five weeks off in between tours to record what would become their debut studio album, though Smith said it was done in around three-and-a-half weeks. The bulk of it was recorded at The Chapel in Lincolnshire with producer Jim Abbiss, who handled recording alongside Ewan Davis. "Munich" was recorded by Loz Beazil at Mayfair Studios in London with Abbiss producing. "Bullets" was recorded at The Magic Garden in Wolverhampton with producer Gavin Monaghan. Andy Taylor served as the Pro Tools operator and engineer. Barny Barnicott mixed most of the album at The Pierce Rooms in London, while "Munich" and "Bullets" were mixed by Cenzo Townshend at Olympic Studios, also in London.

Composition and lyrics
Musically, the sound of The Back Room has been described as post-punk revival, gothic rock and indie pop, compared to the work of Echo & the Bunnymen, specifically their album Heaven Up Here (1981), Elbow and Interpol, specifically their album Antics (2004). Urbanowicz disregarded some of these comparisons, mentioning that the material had already been written before they had "really listened to any of those bands properly". He credited their choice of music to the Walkmen, whose music they listened to incessantly. Smith said, in comparison to their live setting, the album had synthesizers, which gave it a darker electronic nuance. musicOMH wrtier David Turnbull said it was "characterised by thick, prominent basslines, insistent drums, twinkling guitar and a baritone voice". Starting with "Camera", synthesizers take a prominent role in the album's second half. Urbanowicz attributed the album's aggressive tone to when they were living together and working jobs. The title is taken from a line in "Camera"; Smith considered it the "centre piece" of the album. He mentioned that while death, love and loss are reoccurring themes on the album, he intentionally kept the meaning of the songs ambiguous for the listener to make their own interpretations up. Leech said the first two R.E.M. albums, Murmur (1983) and Reckoning (1984), were an influence on Smith's lyrical writings.

On "Lights", the album's opening track, the guitarwork switches from strummed jangling to picking single notes, enhanced by reverb, evoking the style of the Edge from U2. "Munich" follows the same pattern, backed by a drum pattern recalled the one heard in "Evil" (2005) by Interpol. For three of the songs, starting with "Fall", the album's tempo slows down. "All Sparks", the chorus of which was reminiscent of the work Coldplay, is followed by "Camera", which evoked the murder ballads by Bauhaus. Discussing the latter track, Smith said: "A photo can make any previous situation look sweeter. Everyone has a place they hide things they don't want people to see". Matthew Butler of Drowned in Sound said the song "becomes almost biblical with its enriching spirit, replete with echoing church vocals and funeral organ sounds". During the up-tempo track "Fingers in the Factories", which talks about being working class, the vocals, guitars and drums synch up for staccato notes. "Bullets", which recalled the early work of U2, refers to periods in a person's life where situations go awry, including the aftermath of a break-up or being unemployed. "Open Your Arms" evoked "40 (2004) by Franz Ferdinand. The album closes with "Distance", an Interpol-esque track.

Release
Editors' debut single, "Bullets", was released on 24 January 2005, with "You Are Fading" and "Dust in the Sunlight". They embarked on their first UK tour that same month to promote the single. In February 2005, as part of the NME Awards, the band played a one-off show at the Astoria venue in London. "Munich" was released as the second single on 18 April 2005; the seven-inch vinyl version included "Disappear" as its B-side. Two version were released on CD: the first with "Crawl Down the Wall" and "Colours", while the other featured "Release". "Blood" was released as the album's third single on 11 July 2005; the seven-inch vinyl version included "Forest Fire" as its B-side. Two versions were released on CD: the first with "Heads in Bags" and a remix of "Blood" by the Freelance Hellraiser, while the other featured "Let Your Good Heart Lead You Home". The Back Room was released on 25 July 2005 through Kitchenware Records. Nick Southall of Stylus Magazine said its artwork was reminiscent of the cover of Turn On the Bright Lights (2002) by Interpol, "only darker, more monochrome". MTV2 were an early supporter of the band, frequently playing the music videos for "Munich" and "Blood". To promote the album, the band went on tour throughout the month, which was followed by secret shows in Birmingham and London in August 2005.

They then played their debut show in the United States with Maxïmo Park and the Features. "Bullets" was re-released on 26 September 2005; the seven-inch vinyl version included "Time to Slow Down". Two versions were released on CD: the first with "I Buried the Devil", an alternative version of "Blood" and the music video for "Bullets", while the other featured "Come Share the View". Preceded by one-off shows in London and Sheffield, the band performed at the London Astoria on 10 October 2005. They supported Franz Ferdinand on their UK tour and then closed out the year on a tour of small venues alongside the Kooks and Kubichek. On 2 January 2006, "Munich" was re-released; the seven-inch vinyl version included a demo of "Camera" as its B-side. Two versions were released on CD: the first with "French Disko", while the other featured "Find Yourself a Safe Place", a remix of "Munich" and the music video for it, which was directed by Mark Thomas. They promoted this with a short tour of the US later in the month. Following an appearance at the NME Awards, the band went on another UK tour in February and March 2006. On 21 March 2006, The Back Room was released in the US.

"All Sparks" was released as the album's fourth single on 27 March 2006; the seven-inch vinyl version included an acoustic version of "Someone Says" as its B-side. Two versions were released on CD: the first with "The Diplomat", while the other featured "From the Outside", a remix of "All Sparks" and the music video for it, directed by Lee Lennox. Editors then embarked on a co-headlining tour of the US with Stellastarr in March and April 2006, and then went on a trek of Japan and mainland Europe. In May and June 2006, Editors played a short Ireland and UK tour, which ended with a three-date residency at Brixton Academy in London. Preceded by a performance at the Isle of Wight Festival, "Blood" was re-released on 19 June 2006. The 10-inch vinyl version featured a cover of "Road to Nowhere" (1985) by Talking Heads and a remix of "Camera" by Jason Pierce, while the CD edition included a cover of "Orange Crush" (1988) by R.E.M., a remix of "Camera" by Paul Oakenfold and the music video for "Blood".  After an appearance at T in the Park, they went on another US tour in July and August 2006, and then performed at the Jersey Live Festival in the UK in September 2006.

A digipak version from 2005 included a bonus disc, under the name Cuttings, of outtakes and B-sides. In 2006, a CD and DVD set, which featured footage from a show at Paradiso in Amsterdam, was released in European territories. The Japanese edition, released on 23 August 2006, included "Come Share the View" and "Time to Slow Down" as bonus tracks. The Back Room has been re-pressed on vinyl on three occasions, in 2012, 2018 and 2020. It was included, on CD and vinyl, as part of the Unedited (2011) box set, alongside their second studio album An End Has a Start (2007) and third studio album In This Light and on This Evening (2009). "Munich" and "Bullets" were included on the band's first compilation album, Black Gold: Best of Editors (2019).

Critical reception

As a whole, The Back Room was met with generally favourable reviews from music critics. At Metacritic, which assigns a normalized rating out of 100 to reviews from mainstream publications, the album received an average score of 76, based on 23 reviews.

Reviewers were mixed on the album's lyrics. James Jam of NME said it was a "record that hops from hopelessness to hopefulness, often within the space of a chorus". Robert Christgau, writing for The Village Voice, added to this, saying that as Smith "demonstrates, [the lyrics] needn't be morbid or suicidal. His message is often sanely chin-up". Christian Hoard of Rolling Stone felt, however, that Smith tends to get "lost in his own gloom-addled mind" while trying to change lyrical direction from a negative to a positive one, and ends up at something in between the two. Matt Barnes of This Is Fake DIY was annoyed that Smith's talents were undercut by a tendency towards "a hamfisted lyric"; Mxdwn's M. Burns, meanwhile, could not connect because of the "contrived and abstract nature" of the lyrics. Turnbull noticed that others were criticizing the album's lack of "lyrical dexterity"; he too felt that Smith would occasionally use "clumsily teenage blotches", such as in "Camera". 

However, critics received Smith's vocals more positively, complimenting its tone. Hoard praised Smith for being "blessed with that peculiarly British ability to sound simultaneously suave and pained," and on the better tracks, the "give-and-take between Smith's gossamer croon and his band's tensile shimmer can be seductive". Crock felt that Smith sung in a "forceful but wavering voice," likening him to Interpol's Paul Banks. AllMusic reviewer MacKenzie Wilson said that Smith's voice was "passionate without being too steely" in relation to Banks'. The Guardian writer Betty Clarke thought that Smith "emit[ted] low, dissociated vocals" for most of the album, save for "Fingers in the Factories", where his vocals become "sharper than the stabbing rhythm, rendering even the darkness stunning". Chad Grischow of IGN was impressed that Smith's voice had a "deep tone and focused intensity that draws you into the song", admitting that it took him a few listens for him to focus on anything else. Sputnikmusic staff member DaveyBoy likened Smith's voice to being an instrument: "able to sound sophisticated one moment and anguished the next".

Opinions were split on Editors' influences from 1980s acts and comparisons to their contemporaries, with some disregarding these in favour of calling the band's music original. The Irish Times Sinéad Gleeson wrote that the band "plough the same furrow of guitar-flecked morbidity" as Joy Division, "but with pop firmly at their heart". Jam compared some of the tracks to Bauhaus and Interpol, but noted the greatest influence from Joy Division. Burns considered Editors Interpol-soundalikes as they "thrive with tight technique but is missing the darkness and depth of ardor"; Michael Lomas of PopMatters said these comparisons came across as lazy, "but listening to The Back Room, they are undeniable". Pitchfork writer Jason Crock said they frequently "imitate bands with dramatic vocalists [...] but the best moments on The Back Room aren't the theatrical ones-- it's when the four of them are playing and discovering their own chemistry". Gleeson added to this, saying that compared to several other acts "currently plundering '80s music like a supermarket trolley dash, Editors do it with far more imagination while hawking their own sound".

Commercial performance and accolades
The Back Room peaked at number two in both Scotland and the UK. In the US, it reached number 14 on the Billboard Heatseekers Albums component chart and number 21 on the Billboard Independent Albums component chart. Outside of these territories, it charted at number 23 in Ireland, number 30 in the Netherlands, number 53 in the Flanders region of Belgium, number 74 in the Wallonia region of Belgium and number 107 in France. It ranked at number 182 on the 2005 year-end album chart in the UK and number 75 on the 2006 iteration. It was certified platinum in the UK, and gold in Belgium, Ireland and the Netherlands. The Back Room was nominated for the 2006 Mercury Prize in the UK. 

"Bullets" originally charted at number 54 in the UK, but after its reissue it peaked at number 27. "Munich" originally charted at number 22 in the UK, but after its reissue it peaked at number 10. It also reached number 42 in Ireland and number 97 in the Netherlands. It was certified silver by the British Phonographic Industry (BPI) in February 2021. "Blood" originally charted at number 18 in the UK, and reached number 39 after its reissue. "All Sparks" charted at number 21 in the UK.

Track listing
All songs written by Tom Smith, Chris Urbanowicz, Russell Leetch and Ed Lay.

Personnel
Personnel per booklet.

Editors
 Russell Leetch – bass, synthesizer
 Ed Lay – drums
 Tom Smith – vocals, guitar
 Chris Urbanowicz – guitar

Production and design
 Jim Abbiss – producer (all except track 8), recording (all except track 8)
 Ewan Davis – recording (all except tracks 2 and 8)
 Barny Barnicott – mixing (all except tracks 2 and 8)
 Loz Brazil – recording (track 2)
 Cenzo Townshend – mixing (tracks 2 and 8)
 Gavin Monaghan – recording (track 8), producer (track 8)
 Andy Taylor – Pro Tools operator (track 8), engineer (track 8)
 Editors – design, art direction
 The Solution Group – design, art direction
 Wynn White – front cover, rear photography
 Ami Barwell – live photography

Charts

Weekly charts

Year-end charts

Certifications and sales

References

External links

 The Back Room at YouTube (streamed copy where licensed)
 Review at BBC Music
 Review at Billboard

2005 debut albums
Albums produced by Jim Abbiss
Editors (band) albums
Kitchenware Records albums